Segambut is a sub-district and a parliamentary constituency in Kuala Lumpur, Malaysia.

From the high-end condominiums of Mont Kiara and Sri Hartamas to the middle-class areas of Taman Sri Segambut and Bandar Manjalara, and the rural areas of Segambut Dalam and Kampung Sungai Penchala, the Segambut district has a diverse population base.

Segambut once belonged to the mukim of Batu Caves before 1974, when Kuala Lumpur was still part of Selangor.

The new Istana Negara is located in this district, along Jalan Tuanku Abdul Halim (Jalan Duta).

Townships
 Bukit Damansara
 Bukit Kiara
 Bukit Segambut
Bukit Tunku
Desa Park City
Desa Sri Hartamas
Dutamas
 Kampung Concrene
 Kampung Kasipillay
 Kampung Pasir Segambut
 Kampung Sungai Pencala
 Kampung Sungai Udang
KL Metropolis (future)
 Medan Damansara
 Mont Kiara
Pusat Bandar Damansara
Segambut Aman
Segambut Bahagia
 Segambut Dalam
Segambut Damai
Segambut Jaya
 Segambut Luar
Segambut Muda
Segambut Permai
Segambut Tambahan
 Segambut Tengah
Segambut Industrial Park
 Sri Hartamas
 Taman Bamboo (Bamboo Garden)
 Taman Bunga
 Taman City
 Taman City Kanan
Taman Desa Segambut
Taman Duta
 Taman Goh Nam Huat
 Taman Golden
 Taman Kok Doh
Taman Lawa
 Taman Million
Taman Niaga Waris
Taman Prima Impian
Taman Segambut
Taman Sri Bintang
 Taman Sri Kuching
 Taman Sri Segambut
 Taman Sri Sinar
 Taman Segambut
Taman Segambut Indah
Taman Sejahtera
Taman SPPK Segambut
 Taman Tun Dr Ismail (TTDI) Selatan
 Taman Tun Dr Ismail (TTDI) Utara

Education

The French School of Kuala Lumpur is located in Segambut. Its current campus opened in 2005. The Mont'Kiara International School and Garden International School are international schools located within Mont Kiara while the Cempaka International School is located within Damansara Heights. Hibiscus International School in Taman Sri Segambut. SMK Seri Hartamas is one of the well known national secondary schools of Kuala Lumpur located in Desa Sri Hartamas. Other national schools in Segambut are SK Bukit Damansara, SK Seri Hartamas, SK Segambut, SMK Segambut,

Transportation 
Segambut is mainly served by the  Segambut Komuter station, on the KTM Komuter  Port Klang Line, that runs from Tanjung Malim to Port Klang, via KL Sentral and other city-centre stations. It is also served by various rapid transit stations on the  MRT Kajang Line which includes the  Semantan,  Pusat Bandar Damansara and  Taman Tun Dr Ismail stations.

Politics
The constituency was created in 1994 and has been considered to be a Barisan Nasional safe seat until the 2008 General Elections. Datuk Dr Tan Kee Kwong of Parti Gerakan Rakyat Malaysia (Gerakan) had won the seat in the last three terms. However, in the 2008 General Elections, Lim Lip Eng from the Democratic Action Party (DAP) won the seat.

References

 Tan, Karr Wei. "The two faces of Segambut" (Archive). The Star, 23 February 2008.

Suburbs in Kuala Lumpur